Elva Ni (born 15 August 1987) is a Chinese born Hong Kong actress, model, television presenter, TV personality, KOL influencer, and yoga instructor. She was the winner of the 2005 Miss Chinese Toronto Pageant and participated in the Miss Chinese International Pageant.

Early life 
On August 15, 1987, Ni was born in Nanjing, China. Ni's family immigrated to Canada. She has a twin sister named Jennifer, who is residing in Canada.

Education 
In 2005 at age 18, Ni won the 2005 Miss Chinese Toronto Pageant. In 2006 she participated in the Miss Chinese International Pageant. Afterwards, instead of immediately joining the entertainment industry, she returned to Canada to continue her studies.
In 2006, Ni graduated from University of Toronto, majoring in economics. During her time there, she became a host of Toronto New Age Television programmes.

Career 
After graduating in 2006, Ni moved from Canada to Hong Kong to develop her acting career, and was involved in print and television advertisements and endorsements. She also devoted herself to developing films and television programs, her partners included various well-known international brands, television, the internet, newspapers, magazines and other media and all kinds of large-scale fashion activities, made a full commitment to her acting career, and is a unique artist.

Ni is also a cosmetologist, and has 110,000 subscribers on her YouTube Beauty Travel Channel, and her highest CTR video has 250,000 clicks; in addition she has more than four years of yoga experience, obtaining different yoga instructor licenses, from time to time with different brands, taught yoga activities, shared and promoted healthy living and beauty with others and a positive attitude to life, and believed that they could both inside and outside.

Personal life 
Ni announced her engagement on YouTube at 4 January 2019. Her fiancé is known as Mr. V even though she hasn't mentioned his full name yet. Ni has announced that she married Mr. Vincent.

Filmography

Films

Dubbing

TV series
2011: Shenbian De Xingfu (mainland TV series)

Short films
2011: Na Nian

Presented programmes

Toronto New Age Television
2006–09 What's On
2007 Chengshi Da Shijie

Hong Kong and the Mainland
2010 Xingguang Xiawu Cha
2014 Wo Shi Geshou 2 (nowTV broadcast)
2014 Caokong Yinyue (nowTV)
2016 Yo! Gym+ (ViuTV)
2017 Full Time Mommy Holidays (ViuTV)

TV programmes
2011: Zhi Xing Zhi Jin Sifang Cheng
2012: Kuaile Lantian Xia
2017: Fan Dou Yingyu 2011 The English Cult Unit as Elva, yoga coach

Advertising shooting
2010: AMTD Still by Wealth Planning Beauty Nicole (Elva Ni)
2010: Elva Ni, Sen the United States Cracked Con Rumors - "Bridesmaids"
2010: Hong Kong China Travel Service "Friendship Deep Feeling Jane" TV commercials
2010: Li Ning Clothing catalogue
2011: Ocean Park
2011: China Resources
2011: Whiteplan Teeth Whitening
2011: BEA Bank
2011: Tianjin Road Oolong Tea_1
2011: Tianjin Road Oolong Tea_2
2011: PCCW
2011: Li Ning Clothing catalogue
2012: Shu Uemura
2012: Macau Galaxy
2012: Standard Chartered Bank Shocks Stock Offers TV Commercials
2013: Shu Uemura Print Ad (HK)
2013: French Wedding print ad
2013: Bank of China
2013: Kisses Chocolate Print
2013: Nivea (Chian)
2013: C&S Tissue
2015: HTC Mobile
2015: Philips print ad
2016: Slimbeauty print ad

Awards
2005 Miss Chinese Toronto Pageant - Champion, Miss Mirror, Outstanding Talent Award, Perfect Body Award
Miss Chinese International 2006 - The Top Five

News
Elva Ni gave birth to high like Wu Liang model Oriental Daily 23 Jul 2010
Elva Ni Debut Screen has a New Year's Eve Oriental Daily 10 Dec 2010
Elva Ni Wins the Grand Canal Oriental Daily 5 Feb 2011
Elva Ni Use Mode from the Model to the Shadow Tianzi The Sun 6 Aug 2011
Elva Ni Shoot the Ad Shouting Enough for a Minute Wen Wei Po 29 Mar 2012
Elva Ni Captive over a Hundred Boys Oriental Daily 28 Jun 2012
Elva Ni: Mr. Right Do Not Be Pretty Oriental Daily 31 Aug 2012
Only Pursue "Hong Kong" Movie Dream Elva Ni no Regrets The Sun 1 Sep 2012
Elva Ni Skiing All Over the Place The Sun 6 Feb 2013
Elva Ni Favorite Shimei Oriental Daily 11 Feb 2013
Elva Ni Out of the Sexy Calendar Apple Daily 30 Nov 2013

References

External links
 
 
 
 

1987 births
Living people
Hong Kong female models
University of Toronto alumni
Hong Kong film actresses
Actresses from Nanjing